The 1977–78 season was Mansfield Town's 41st season in the Football League and 1st and to date only season in the Second Division, they finished in 22nd position with 31 points seven points away from safety.

Final league table

Results

Football League Second Division

FA Cup

League Cup

Squad statistics
 Squad list sourced from

References
General
 Mansfield Town 1977–78 at soccerbase.com (use drop down list to select relevant season)

Specific

Mansfield Town F.C. seasons
Mansfield Town